No More Tears is a sampler EP, released as a promotional compilation CD to promote both the reissue of Black Label Society's Sonic Brew, as well as Spitfire Records' reissues of Zakk Wylde's albums Pride & Glory and Book of Shadows.

Track listing

Personnel
Zakk Wylde – vocals, guitar, bass, harmonica
Phil Ondich – drums (tracks 1 and 2)
Mike Inez – bass (track 1)
Joe Vitale – drums, keyboards (tracks 5 and 6)
James Lomenzo – bass (tracks 3, 4, 5 and 6)
Brian Tichy – drums (tracks 3 and 4)

Black Label Society albums
1999 debut EPs